New York Executive Law § 63(12), sometimes called simply "6312", is a New York law that gives the Attorney General of New York broad powers to investigate and prosecute cases of civil fraud. Due to its broad definitions, section 63(12) provides the AG with far-reaching powers to issue subpoenas, as well as low legal hurdles to do so. The law was passed in 1956, while Jacob Javits was attorney general.

References

External links
 New York Executive Law § 63(12)

New York (state) law